Müşkəmir (also, Mushkemir and Myushkyamir) is a village in the Ismailli Rayon of Azerbaijan.  The village forms part of the municipality of Zərnava.

References 

Populated places in Ismayilli District